Pərioğlular or Perioglular or Peioglylar or Parioglylar may refer to:
Pərioğlular, Agdam, Azerbaijan
Pərioğlular, Aghjabadi, Azerbaijan